Jenny Elvers (during her marriage from 2003 to 2013 Jenny Elvers-Elbertzhagen) (born 11 May 1972), is a German actress and television personality.
She studied acting in Berlin, Hamburg and Chicago, and has worked as an actress and hostess since the early 1990s. She was married to her agent.

Filmography
1995: Jailbirds (directed by Detlev Buck)
1996: Knockin' on Heaven's Door (with Til Schweiger)
1994: Otto - Die Serie (with Otto Waalkes )
1995: Der Elefant vergißt nie (The Elephant Never Forgets, directed by Detlev Buck)
1996: Nikola
1998: Top of the Pops (the hostess)
2006: Tough Enough (directed by Detlev Buck)
2007: Kopf oder Zahl
2009: Löwenzahn
2009: Großstadtrevier
2009: 
2009: Tierärztin Dr. Mertens
2009: All You Need Is Love – Meine Schwiegertochter ist ein Mann
2009: Leipzig Homicide
2010: Auch das noch
2011: Cologne P.D. - Playback
2011: Ein Fall für Zwei
2011: Notruf Hafenkante
2011: Der Kriminalist
2013: Küstenwache – Aus Mangel an Beweisen
2014: Frauenherzen
2015: Abschussfahrt
2015: Kartoffelsalat – Nicht fragen!
2015: SOKO 5113 - Opfer
2016: Böser Wolf
2016: SOKO Wismar - Tödliches Alibi
2016: Ich bin ein Star – Holt mich hier raus!

External links

 Official website
 

20th-century German actresses
German television presenters
21st-century German actresses
German film actresses
1972 births
Living people
German women television presenters
Ich bin ein Star – Holt mich hier raus! participants